Captain Ernest Edmund "Ted" Fresson,   (20 September 1891 – 25 September 1963) was a British engineer and aviation pioneer.

Life
Fresson was sent by his company to China in 1911, but returned to the UK to serve in the Royal Flying Corps during the First World War, undergoing flying training in Canada in 1918. After the war he went back to China where he built, reassembled and designed aircraft for local dignitaries. He returned to the United Kingdom after the 1927 revolution, and started giving joy rides to the public, flying for a company called Berkshire Aviation Tours, touring England and Scotland, flying from any available fields. In January 1929 with another Berkshire pilot he founded North British Aviation Co Ltd, based at Hooton Park on the Wirral Peninsula, Cheshire. This company performed pleasure flights and air displays in the northwest of England, mainly using Avro 504K aircraft, and was incorporated into Alan Cobham's Flying Circus in 1933.

He established an airline, Highland Airways, in Scotland in April 1933. He was awarded the first contract for domestic airmail in the UK on 29 May 1934, flying between Aberdeen and Orkney.

During the Second World War, he advised the Air Ministry and Admiralty on where to build its airfields in Scotland: he is credited with building the first tarmac runway built in the UK, at RNAS Hatston, Orkney. His airline was absorbed into the wartime Scottish Airways, and into the nationalised British European Airways Corporation after the war: he continued to work in the airline's management until he was let go in March 1948. In retirement, he continued to fly charter passengers across northern Scotland.

Honours

In the 1943 Birthday Honours, he was appointed an Officer of the Order of the British Empire (OBE) in recognition of his work as Managing Director of Scottish Airways Limited.

In 2011, a bronze statue of Fresson was unveiled at Sumburgh Airport. A memorial to him stands in front of Kirkwall Airport.

Selected works

References

External links
 Likeness
 

1891 births
1963 deaths
20th-century British engineers
British business executives
Royal Flying Corps officers
Aviation history of Scotland
Commercial aviators
British World War I pilots
Officers of the Order of the British Empire
British expatriates in China